Patrick Gilhooley (6 July 1876 – 20 February 1907) was a Scottish footballer who played as an inside forward in the Football League for Sheffield United, and in the Southern League for Tottenham Hotspur. He had earlier played for Celtic, winning the Scottish Football League championship in 1897–98.

In the spring of 1898, Gilhooley played in a SFL representative team match and in a Home Scots v Anglo-Scots international trial, but he never received a full cap for Scotland.

References

1876 births
1907 deaths
Scottish footballers
Association football forwards
English Football League players
Southern Football League players
Scottish Junior Football Association players
Scottish Football League players
Scottish Football League representative players
Footballers from South Lanarkshire
Larkhall Thistle F.C. players
Cambuslang Hibernian F.C. players
Celtic F.C. players
Sheffield United F.C. players
Tottenham Hotspur F.C. players
Brighton & Hove Albion F.C. players